The Saunders Roe A.27 London was a British military biplane flying boat built by the Saunders Roe company. Only 31 were built, entering service with the Royal Air Force (RAF) in 1936. Although due for replacement by the outbreak of World War II, they saw some active service pending the introduction of the ultimately unsuccessful Lerwick.

Development
The A.27 London was designed in response to the Air Ministry Specification R.24/31 issued for a "General Purpose Open Sea Patrol Flying Boat" and was based on the Saro A.7 Severn. The London and its contemporary, the Supermarine Stranraer, were the last multi-engine, biplane flying-boats to see service with the RAF. The design utilized an all-metal corrugated hull and fabric-covered wing and tail surfaces, with two Bristol Pegasus II radial engines, mounted on the upper wing to keep them clear of spray while taking off and landing.

The first prototype first flew in March 1934  and then went on to serve until 1936 with 209 and 210 Squadrons of the RAF at RAF Felixstowe and Gibraltar respectively.

The first deliveries of production aircraft began in March 1936 with Pegasus III engines, and from the eleventh aircraft onwards the Pegasus X engine was fitted instead and the aircraft's designation changed to London Mk.II. Earlier Londons were retrofitted with the Pegasus X and were also given the "Mk.II" designation.

Operational history

The London Mk.II model equipped 201 Squadron RAF at RAF Calshot beginning in 1936, replacing Supermarine Southamptons. Others later were delivered in October 1936 to 204 Squadron RAF at RAF Mount Batten, Plymouth, also replacing Southamptons. More were delivered to the same squadron in 1937 to replace Blackburn Perths, and to 202 Squadron RAF at Kalafrana, Malta, replacing Supermarine Scapas, and 228 Squadron RAF at Pembroke Dock.

In 1937–1938 204 Squadron RAF used five Londons equipped with auxiliary external fuel tanks for a long-distance training flight to Australia to celebrate the 150th anniversary of the founding of the Colony at Sydney, New South Wales. In this configuration, they had a range of 2,600 miles (4,180 km).

At the outbreak of World War II in September 1939, Londons equipped 201 Squadron RAF, which was by now stationed at Sullom Voe in Shetland, and 202 Squadron RAF at Gibraltar, as well as 240 Squadron RAF at Invergordon, which had re-equipped with Londons in July 1939. These aircraft carried out active patrols over the North Sea and the Mediterranean. Some were fitted with a dorsal fuel tank to increase operational radius. Armament in the form of bombs, depth charges, and naval mines up to a total weight of 2,000 lb (907 kg) could be carried beneath the lower wings.

Gradually, the Londons' duties were assumed by newer aircraft such as the Lockheed Hudson, while squadrons flying Atlantic and Mediterranean patrols were re-equipped with Short Sunderlands. All were withdrawn from front-line duties by the middle of 1941.

Variants
 Prototype
 One only
 London Mk.I
 10 built with two 820 hp Pegasus III engines and two-bladed propellers. Later converted to Mk II.
 London Mk.II
 20 built with two 915 hp Pegasus X engines and four-bladed propellers.

Operators

 Royal Air Force
 No. 201 Squadron RAF (Apr 1936 – Apr 1940)
 No. 202 Squadron RAF (Sep 1937 – Jun 1941)
 No. 204 Squadron RAF (Oct 1936 – Jul 1939)
 No. 209 Squadron RAF (Oct 1934 – Feb 1936)
 No. 210 Squadron RAF (Oct 1935 – Nov 1935)
 No. 228 Squadron RAF (Feb 1937 – Sep 1938)
 No. 240 Squadron RAF (Jul 1939 – Jul 1940)

Specifications (London Mk.II)

See also

References

Bibliography

 Burney, Allan. Flying Boats of World War 2 (The Aeroplane; & Flight Magazine Aviation Archive Series). London: Key Publishing Ltd., 2015. 
 Green, William. War Planes of the Second World War, Volume Five: Flying Boats. London: Macdonald & Co. (Publishers) Ltd., 1962 (Fifth impression 1972). .
 Jefford, C.G. RAF Squadrons, a Comprehensive record of the Movement and Equipment of all RAF Squadrons and their Antecedents since 1912. Shrewsbury, Shropshire, UK: Airlife Publishing, 1988 (second edition 2001). .
 London, Peter. Saunders and Saro Aircraft Since 1917. London: Putnam (Conway Maritime Press), London, 1988. .
 March, Daniel J. British Warplanes of World War II: Combat Aircraft of the RAF and Fleet AIr Arm, 1939–1945. Hoo, near Rochester, Kent, UK: Aerospace Publishing Ltd., 1998. .
 Mondey, David. The Hamlyn Concise Guide to British Aircraft of World War II. Hamlyn (publishers),1982 (republished 1994 by Chancellor Press, reprinted 2002). .

External links

 Saunders Roe & British Hovercraft Corporation Archive
 Saro London – British Aircraft Directory

1930s British military reconnaissance aircraft
Flying boats
London
Biplanes
Aircraft first flown in 1934
Twin piston-engined tractor aircraft